is a town located in Tsuzuki District, Kyoto Prefecture, Japan.

 the town has an estimated population of 7,163. The total area is 18.04 km².

Demographics
Per Japanese census data, the population of Ide has declined in recent decades.

References

External links

Ide official website 

Towns in Kyoto Prefecture